Tuveh (also Romanized as Tūveh; also known as Tāveh, Toveh, and Tūvah) is a village in Mazu Rural District, Alvar-e Garmsiri District, Andimeshk County, Khuzestan Province, Iran. At the 2006 census, its population was 26, in 10 families.

References 

Populated places in Andimeshk County